"Moth to a Flame" is a song by Swedish house music supergroup Swedish House Mafia and Canadian singer the Weeknd. It was released on 22 October 2021 through Republic Records, as the third single from the group's debut studio album Paradise Again. The song is also included as a bonus track on the "Alternate World" edition of the Weeknd's fifth studio album Dawn FM.

Background and release
A potential collaboration between Swedish House Mafia and the Weeknd was first speculated when the group signed with the Weeknd's longtime manager Wassim "Sal" Slaiby in April 2021. It was later teased by the Weeknd during an episode of his Apple Music 1 radio show Memento Mori, in which he stated in the introduction "The Swedes just landed in L.A." A snippet of "Moth to a Flame" was then revealed by Swedish House Mafia during their performance at the 2021 MTV Video Music Awards in September. On 19 October, the group and the singer teased the single once again before announcing that it would be released on 22 October. In celebration of its release, Swedish House Mafia hosted the twentieth episode of Memento Mori.

Critical reception
Dani Blum of Pitchfork named "Moth to a Flame" the best song on Paradise Again, writing that the "tingling production is more elegant than Swedish House Mafia seemed capable of a decade ago." Robin Murray of Clash described it as "a sizzling 80s tinged burner that places [the Weeknd] within an electronic orchestra." Thomas Stremfel of Spectrum Culture wrote that "equally unique framing and biblical stakes elevate the track to a pop epic." Billboards Starr Bowenbank compared "Moth to a Flame" to the Weeknd's "Blinding Lights", highlighting its synth as being menacing in a manner akin to the song.

Chart performance
In the United Kingdom, "Moth to a Flame" debuted at number 15 on the UK Singles Chart with first-week sales of 19,853 units, making it Swedish House Mafia's seventh top 20 single and the Weeknd's 19th. In the United States, "Moth to a Flame" entered the Hot Dance/Electronic Songs chart at number two with 12.9 million streams, 1.7 million radio impressions and 3,800 downloads sold in its opening week. It marked Swedish House Mafia's third top 10 single on the chart and was the highest debut on the chart since Kygo and Whitney Houston's "Higher Love" in July 2019.

Music video 
The music video for the song premiered on 22 October 2021 alongside the single's release and was directed by Alexander Wessely. The music video ends with a snippet of "Mafia", the track that follows "Moth to a Flame" on Paradise Again.

Live performances
Swedish House Mafia and the Weeknd performed "Moth to a Flame" at the Coachella Valley Music and Arts Festival on 17 April 2022.

Track listing
Digital download and streaming
 "Moth to a Flame" – 3:54

Digital download and streaming – Extended Mix
 "Moth to a Flame" (Extended Mix) – 5:00

Digital download and streaming – Chris Lake Remix
 "Moth to a Flame" (Chris Lake Remix) – 4:38

Digital download and streaming – Tourist Remix
 "Moth to a Flame" (Tourist Remix) – 4:53

Digital download and streaming – Moojo Remix
 "Moth to a Flame" (Moojo Remix) – 7:14

Digital download and streaming – Adriatique Remix
 "Moth to a Flame" (Adriatique Remix) – 6:29

Personnel
 Swedish House Mafia – production, keyboards, bass, drum programming
 Carl Nordström – production, keyboards, bass, drum programming 
 Shin Kamiyama – mixing
 Mike Dean – mastering
 The Weeknd – vocals

Charts

Weekly charts

Year-end charts

Certifications

Release history

References

External links
  
  
 
 

2021 singles
2021 songs
The Weeknd songs
Swedish House Mafia songs
Songs written by the Weeknd
Songs written by Axwell
Songs written by Sebastian Ingrosso
Songs written by Steve Angello
Republic Records singles
Synth-pop songs